Occupy Boston was a collective of protesters that settled on September 30, 2011 in Boston, Massachusetts, on Dewey Square in the Financial District opposite the Federal Reserve Bank of Boston. It is related to the Occupy Wall Street movement that began in New York City on September 17, 2011.

As of June 2012, Occupy Boston had continued to engage in organized meetings, events and actions.

Overview

On October 10, 2011, the Boston demonstrators expanded a tent city onto an additional portion of the Rose Kennedy Greenway; starting around 1:20 AM the following morning, 141 people were arrested by the officers of the Boston Police Special Operations Unit. Most of these cases were dismissed prior to arraignment with the agreement of the Suffolk County District Attorney's office. Tents were pitched in the following days, and by October 15 the camp itself had consisted of about 90 tents on either side of a path the protesters named, "Main Street," plus another two dozen or so tents divided up between the "Student Village" area and a strip of lawn the protesters named "Weird Street".

A tent library, later named the Audre Lorde to Howard Zinn (A to Z) Library was set up at the Occupy Boston encampment with the mission to "foster inquiry, learning, critical analysis and information-sharing among Occupy Boston occupiers, participants and visitors in order to better understand, challenge and transform interlocking systems of oppression".

Members of Occupy Boston marched with students at Harvard University on November 9, 2011, to create the Occupy Harvard in Harvard Yard. The two groups later collaborated to interrupt a Newt Gingrich speech at Harvard on November 18.

By November 17, 2011 a judge issued an order prohibiting the eviction of protesters from Occupy Boston. On December 7, 2011 a Boston judge rescinded the temporary restraining order, allowing Boston Mayor Thomas Menino to remove the protesters from Dewey Square. At 5:00 AM on December 10, 2011, Boston police moved in and raided the Occupation of Dewey Square, with 46 people arrested.

Police officers collected $1.4 million dollars in overtime from the city of Boston.

The Boston Occupier

The Boston Occupier was an independent newspaper that was born out of the Occupy Boston movement. The title was originally The Occupy Boston Globe, but was changed shortly before the first publication in order to avoid association with the Boston Globe.

The newspaper launched in October 2011, with the first issue being released on November 18, 2011 with a run of 25,000 copies. The paper was funded with donations from a Kickstarter campaign, which raised approximately $9,300 in donations.

Images

See also

Occupy articles
 List of global Occupy protest locations
 Occupy movement
 Timeline of Occupy Wall Street
 We are the 99%

Other Protests
 15 October 2011 global protests
 2011 United States public employee protests
 2011 Wisconsin protests

Related articles
 Arab Spring
 Corruption Perceptions Index
 Economic inequality
 Grassroots movement

 Income inequality in the United States
 Lobbying
 Plutocracy
 Protest
 Tea Party protests
 Wealth inequality in the United States

Related portals:

References

Further reading
 Yount, Scot (October 22, 2011.) "Occupy Boston protesters set sights on Boston Police Department." New England Cable News. Accessed October 2011.
 Jess Bidgood. "Boston Police Pass on Evicting Occupy Protesters." New York Times, December 9, 2011

External links

 Official website
 Occupy Boston Wiki
 Boston Occupier
 Flickr. Occupy Boston (Sunday, Oct 3, 2011) photos by Massachusetts Cop Block
 Flickr. Occupy Boston 10-5-2011 photos by Ethan Long
 Flickr. Occupy Boston - Police Raid, Oct. 10, 2011, photos by Paul Weiskel
 Flickr. Occupy Boston photos by Sam Marshall
 "Occupy" photographs from around the nation from the Denver Post
 

Occupy movement in the United States
Protests in Massachusetts
Organizations based in Boston
Culture of Boston
History of Boston
2011 in Boston
2011 in Massachusetts
Articles containing video clips